Skylar Rutherford Thomas (born July 27, 1993) is a Canadian professional soccer player who plays for Memphis 901 in the USL Championship.

Club career

Early career
Thomas began playing soccer at age six with Pickering SC.

Thomas attended Syracuse University for four years, playing for the Orange. During his senior year at Syracuse in 2014, he was named All-ACC Second Team and NSCAA All-South Region Second Team. In 2012, he played with TFC Academy in the Canadian Soccer League.

Toronto FC II
Thomas was drafted in the first round, 11th overall, in the 2015 MLS SuperDraft by Toronto FC on January 15, 2015. On March 12 it was announced that he had signed with Toronto's affiliate team, Toronto FC II in the USL ahead of their inaugural season. He made his debut on April 19 against Whitecaps FC 2 as a substitute for Daniel Fabrizi.

Charleston Battery
Thomas would sign with Charleston Battery for the 2017 season, and would appear in 8 of the team's 13 clean sheets. Upon completion of the 2017 season, Thomas would have his option with the club exercised for the 2018 season.

Valour FC
Thomas signed for Canadian Premier League club Valour FC in November 2018, having played previously for head coach Rob Gale with the Canadian U-23 national team. Upon signing with Valour, Thomas indicated he wanted to be a part of building the league.

Pittsburgh Riverhounds
On February 25, 2020, Thomas joined Pittsburgh Riverhounds SC ahead of the 2020 season.

Memphis 901
On March 22, 2021, Thomas moved to USL Championship side Memphis 901.

International career
Thomas has represented Canada at the U18 and U20 level, appearing in camps for both in 2011 and 2012, respectively.

In May 2016, Thomas was called to Canada's U23 national team for a pair of friendlies against Guyana and Grenada. He saw action in both matches.

Personal life
Thomas was born in Scarborough, Ontario, to a Canadian mother and a Trinidadian father. When he was five, his family moved to Pickering.

References

External links
 

1993 births
Living people
Association football defenders
Canadian soccer players
Soccer players from Toronto
Sportspeople from Scarborough, Toronto
Canadian sportspeople of Trinidad and Tobago descent
Canadian expatriate soccer players
Expatriate soccer players in the United States
Syracuse Orange men's soccer players
Toronto FC players
Reading United A.C. players
Toronto FC draft picks
Toronto FC II players
Charleston Battery players
Valour FC players
Pittsburgh Riverhounds SC players
Memphis 901 FC players
Canadian Soccer League (1998–present) players
USL League Two players
USL Championship players
Canadian Premier League players
Canada men's under-23 international soccer players
Pickering FC players
Canadian expatriate sportspeople in the United States